NEGO (born January 18, 2002) also known as Genc Avdyli is an Albanian record producer, singer and songwriter. He is best known for his hit song “Karma” which he released in 2020.

Life and career
NEGO was born and raised in Kosovo. He started his career in 2018 as a beatmaker and later as a singer. In 2019, he released his debut song, Gianni.

In September 2020, as a record producer and singer, NEGO released the music video Bandita in collaboration with Valo93.  Later in December 2020, he released Karma, which became an instant hit garnering  over 7 million views on YouTube.

In 2021, NEGO released another video song, Tu E Lut, which he composed and produced. He also composed music and published a video clip for Ke Ndryshu'''. Later in the same year, he also released the music video Paranoja.

In 2022, NEGO released various music videos, including Bebe and Fajsom. In October 2022, he collaborated with the artist 2Ton for the music video Monotonia''.

Discography

References

External links
 NEGO on Spotify
 
 
 NEGO on YouTube
 NEGO on Apple_Music

2002 births
Albanian record producers
Albanian songwriters
Albanian singers
Albanian people
Living people